Ignaz Robert Schütz (1867, Březová (Moravia) – 1927, Brno) was a Czech–German mathematician and a physicist.

He studied at the University of Munich where in 1894 he obtained a Ph.D in physics. Schütz was assistant to Ludwig Boltzmann in Munich from 1891 to 1894, the year of Boltzmann's departure from Munich. In 1897, Ignaz R. Schütz, then a member of the Institute for Theoretical Physics at Göttingen,  showed how time translational symmetry induces conservation of energy.

Notes

References

External links 
 

1867 births
1920 deaths